Ihor Volodymyrovych Mosiychuk (born 5 May 1972, Lubny, Poltava Oblast) is a Ukrainian journalist and far-right politician, a leading figure in the organized social-nationalist movement, the editor-in-chief of the newspaper Vechirnaya Vasilkov, and a participant in the Vasylkiv terrorists case. He is a former deputy of Verkhovna Rada from Radical Party of Oleh Lyashko.

In early 2014, Mosiychuk served as the deputy commander of the Azov Battalion. After he made Jew-baiting comments about Ihor Kolomoisky, he was removed.

On 25 October 2017, a parked scooter exploded in Kyiv near the building of Espreso TV, which was, according to an investigation by the Ukrainian police, an assassination attempt on him. The blast killed his bodyguard and another man. Mosiychuk and a political scientist Vitaliy Bala along with another woman were injured.

Mosiychuk's Radical Party lost all its parliamentary seats in the 2019 Ukrainian parliamentary election, because  it gained about 1%, too little to clear the 5% election threshold, and also did not win an electoral district seat.

References

1972 births
Living people
People from Lubny
Eighth convocation members of the Verkhovna Rada
Ukrainian journalists
Ukrainian nationalists
Inmates of Lukyanivska Prison
People of the Euromaidan
Radical Party of Oleh Liashko politicians